Mount Jigong is a mountain in Shihe District, Xinyang, Henan Province, China, located near the border with Hubei Province to the south. The name, which means Rooster Mountain or Cockerel Mountain, is derived from its shape.

It used to be a summer retreat for Western missionaries and, later, for Communist officials.  From 1898 to 1936, over 300 villas of various styles were built on the mountain by foreign missionaries of different countries and the area became a famed summer resort.  It is 38 km from downtown Xinyang.

Climate 

Mount Jigong has a humid subtropical climate (Köppen climate classification Cwa).

References

Jigong
Tourist attractions in Henan
Xinyang